, meaning  in Japanese, are carp-shaped windsocks traditionally flown in Japan to celebrate , a traditional calendrical event which is now designated as , a national holiday in Japan.  are made by drawing carp patterns on paper, cloth or other nonwoven fabric. They are then allowed to flutter in the wind.

Children's Day takes place on May 5, the last day of Golden Week, the largest break for workers and also a week in which many businesses, state schools, and some private schools close for up to 9–10 days for the designated national holidays.

Description

The number and meaning of the carp streamers or  that fly beneath the windsock has changed over time. Traditionally, the set would contain a black  representing the father, followed by a smaller, red  representing his eldest son. This is why, according to the Japanese American National Museum, in the traditional "children's song," the red one represents the eldest son. If more boys were in the household, an additional blue, green and then, depending on the region, either purple or orange  were added. After the government's decree that converted  into the present , the holiday came to celebrate the happiness of both boys and girls. As a result, the red  came to represent the mother of the family and it is not uncommon for the color to be varied as pink. Similarly, the other colors and sizes of carp came to represent all the family's children, both sons and daughters.

 range from a few centimetres to a few metres long.

History

 have been in use since the 18th century. The colorful  as they are modernly known became popular in the Meiji era (1868–1912).

Though originally exclusive to samurai households, they eventually reached the rest of the population. They were traditionally flown as part of the Japanese Boys' Day, with one carp for each son, while girls found a counterpart to this custom in  'Doll's Day'. However, after the redesignation of May 5th as Children's Day in 1948, some families began flying koi for every child, regardless of gender. The koi, known for its ability to swim upstream, represents courage, determination, and the hope that children will grow up healthily. This symbolism pays homage to the myth of longmen from the late Han dynasty, that a golden koi fish swam up a waterfall at the end of the Yellow River and became a dragon.

The number of  included on a pole and the variety of their colors have increased over time to accommodate more family members. They were originally made by hand-painting materials such as paper or cloth, but these have almost entirely fallen out of use in favour of synthetics, outside of some rural areas. Silk and paper models are still sold, but at a higher price than the synthetics. 

As a tradition, throughout Children's Day, children also thank and show respect for relatives, parents, and teachers for support throughout their life.

song
A famous  song often sung by children and their families. The lyrics are by Miyako Kondō. The composer is unknown.

Gallery

See also
 Dragon Boat Festival

References

External links

Festivals in Japan
Japanese-language songs
Japanese words and phrases
Japanese folk art
Articles containing video clips